Lilya Budaghyan is a Norwegian-Armenian cryptographer, computer scientist, and discrete mathematician known for her work on cryptographic Boolean functions. She is a professor at the Department of Informatics of the University of Bergen in Norway, where she directs the Selmer Center in Secure Communication and leads Boolean functions team.

Education and career
Lilya Budaghyan earned a diploma in mathematics, summa cum laude, from Yerevan State University in 1998. After additional graduate research at Yerevan State University, she completed a Ph.D. at Otto von Guericke University Magdeburg in Germany in 2005. Her PhD dissertation is The equivalence of almost bent and almost perfect nonlinear functions and their generalizations.

After postdoctoral research at the University of Trento, Italy, the University of Bergen, and the University of Paris 8 Vincennes-Saint-Denis, she became a professor at the University of Bergen in 2019.

Works
Lilya Budaghyan is the author of the book Construction and Analysis of Cryptographic Functions (Springer, 2014).

Also, she is a co-author for the works "New classes of almost bent and almost perfect nonlinear polynomials", "Constructing new APN functions from known ones", "Two classes of quadratic APN binomials inequivalent to power functions", "Constructing APN functions through isotopic shifts", "A new family of APN quadrinomials", "Relation between o-equivalence and EA-equivalence for Niho bent functions", "On two fundamental problems on APN power functions, ""On the Distance Between APN Functions", "An Optimal Universal Construction for the Threshold Implementation of Bijective S-boxes" and others.

Recognition
Prof. Budaghyan won the Emil Artin Junior Prize in Mathematics in 2011 for a joint paper with Tor Helleseth titled “New commutative semifields defined by new PN multinomials”. In 2022 another paper co-authored by Lilya Budaghyan led to Emil Artin Junior Prize "Relation between o-equivalence and EA-equivalence for Niho bent functions".

Lilya Budaghyan held PhD fellowship of Saxen Anhalt (2002), postdoctoral fellowship of Foundation of Mathematical Sciences of Paris (2012), habilitation in mathematics from the University of Paris 8 (2013), "Young Research Talent" grant from the Research Council of Norway (2014), Trond Mohn foundation starting grant award (2016). 

She is a member of the Norwegian Academy of Technological Sciences, elected in 2019.

References

External links
Home page

Year of birth missing (living people)
Living people
21st-century Armenian mathematicians
Armenian women scientists
Norwegian computer scientists
Norwegian women computer scientists
21st-century Norwegian mathematicians
Norwegian women mathematicians
Norwegian cryptographers
Modern cryptographers
Yerevan State University alumni
Academic staff of the University of Bergen
Members of the Norwegian Academy of Technological Sciences